Marcelo Pablo Jorquera Silva (born 13 October 1992) is a Chilean footballer currently playing for Cobresal.

External links
 
 

1992 births
Living people
Chilean footballers
Ñublense footballers
Cobresal footballers
Deportes Iberia footballers
Deportes Iquique footballers
Rangers de Talca footballers
Universidad de Chile footballers
Chilean Primera División players
Primera B de Chile players
Association football fullbacks